The 2007 Bausch & Lomb Championships was the 28th edition of that tennis tournament and was played on outdoor clay courts.  The tournament was classified as a Tier II event on the 2007 WTA Tour. The event took place at the Racquet Park at the Amelia Island Plantation, in Amelia Island, Florida, U.S. from April 2 through April 8, 2007. Tatiana Golovin won the singles title.

Finals

Singles

 Tatiana Golovin defeated  Nadia Petrova, 6–2, 6–1
It was Golovin's first career title.

Doubles

 Mara Santangelo /  Katarina Srebotnik defeated  Anabel Medina Garrigues /  Virginia Ruano Pascual, 6–3, 7–6(7–4)

External links
 ITF tournament edition details

Bausch and Lomb Championships
Amelia Island Championships
Bausch & Lomb Championships
Bausch & Lomb Championships
Bausch & Lomb Championships